The Edgefield, Trenton and Aiken Railroad was a railroad that served South Carolina immediately after the end of the Reconstruction Era of the United States.

Creation
In 1879, the charter of the Edgefield Branch Railroad was amended to change the line's name to the Edgefield, Trenton and Aiken Railroad Company. The Edgefield Branch Railroad was incorporated to build a railroad line between Edgefield Court House, South Carolina, to Trenton, South Carolina, where it could connect with the Charlotte, Columbia and Augusta Railroad.

Route
 Edgefield
 Trenton, junction with Charlotte, Columbia and Augusta Railroad
 Aiken

Merger
The Edgefield, Trenton and Aiken joined with the Atlantic and French Broad Valley Railroad in 1882 to form the French Broad and Atlantic Railway.

See also
 Atlantic and French Broad Valley Railroad
 Belton, Williamston and Easley Railroad
 Carolina and Cumberland Gap Railway
 Carolina, Cumberland Gap and Chicago Railway
 Edgefield Branch Railroad
 French Broad and Atlantic Railway

References

Defunct South Carolina railroads
Railway companies established in 1879
Railway companies disestablished in 1882